Container Wars is an American reality television series on TruTV that premiered in 2013. The show was renewed for second season of 13 episodes in September 2013.

The show features the auctioneer John Kunkle, as well as buyers: Jason R. Hughes, the Israeli team consisting of Shlomi, Eyal and Uzi, the team of Ty and Mo, Deana Molle, and Matthew Gaus.

Taking place at commercial shipping ports, the series centers on a group of experts from various backgrounds who spend tens of thousands of dollars to compete for the contents of high-value shipping containers from around the world. With only minutes to assess the containers and decide whether to bid, the pressure mounts as they walk away with big wins or go home empty-handed.

See also

 Auction chant
 Storage Wars, a similar show on A&E
 Auction Hunters, a similar show on Spike
 Storage Hunters, a similar show on truTV

References

External links
  at truTV
 

2013 American television series debuts
TruTV original programming
2010s American reality television series
Auction television series
English-language television shows
2014 American television series endings